Elisabeth Barker (22 March 1910 – 19 March 1986) was an English journalist, historian and civil servant.

Life
Elisabeth Barker was born in Oxford, the daughter of Emily and Ernest Barker. She was educated at St Paul's Girls' School and Lady Margaret Hall, Oxford where she read mods and greats. In summer 1932 she visited her brother Arthur, then Times correspondent in Vienna, and continued traveling across Eastern Europe and the Balkans. In 1934 she joined the BBC, working in the news library and later as a sub-editor in overseas news.

Works
 Truce in the Balkans, 1948
 Macedonia: its place in Balkan power politics, 1950
 Britain in a Divided Europe 1945-1970, 1971
 The Cold War, 1972
 Austria: 1918-1972, 1973
 The Common Market, 1973
 Churchill and Eden at War, 1978
 The British between the Superpowers (1945-1950), 1983

References

1910 births
1986 deaths
English journalists
English historians
English civil servants
20th-century British writers
Alumni of Lady Margaret Hall, Oxford